Rab effector Noc2 is a protein that in humans is encoded by the RPH3AL gene.

Interactions 

RPH3AL has been shown to interact with RAB27A.

References

Further reading